Raw FM was an Australian Television series produced by the Australian Broadcasting Corporation that aired for one season of thirteen episodes between November 1997 and February 1998. Raw FM was about an independent radio station of the same name and the young people that ran it. Many of the episode titles were a word-play on the word raw, such as "Raw 'n' Sore" and "A Raw Nerve".

The cast included Nadine Garner, Dominic Purcell and Sophie Heathcote. Also featured was Amiel Daemion in a recurring role.

The series has since been repeated by the ABC and was also shown on Channel V.

Plot 
Granger (Dominic Purcell), a DJ at commercial radio station Rock FM is fired from his job, so he and his long-time friends Robert and the blind Zelda (Nadine Garner) decide to start their own independent radio station. However, they are completely unprepared for the number of kids who show up wanting to be DJs — many of whom are quite lazy. They hire a staff from the group of volunteers, and have a launch party. In subsequent episodes, we find out more about each of the staff as different episodes focus on different characters.

Raw FM Dance Floor Radio 
Raw FM is also an Australian narrowcast radio network unrelated to the Television series, with stations in New South Wales, Australian Capital Territory, Victoria and Queensland.

See also 
 List of Australian television series
 Australian Broadcasting Corporation
 Triple J

External links
 Raw FM at IMDB
 Raw FM - ABC-TV official site (archived)
 Raw FM - Dance Floor Radio
Raw FM - "What You Can" at Australian Screen Online

Australian drama television series
1997 Australian television series debuts
1998 Australian television series endings
Australian Broadcasting Corporation original programming